Lam Wah Ee Nursing College, abbreviated as LWENC, is a private nursing college located in George Town, Penang, affiliated to Lam Wah Ee Hospital. It is the first private nursing college in northern region of Peninsular Malaysia.

Its three-year diploma in nursing accredited by Malaysian Qualifications Agency, recognized by Malaysian Nursing Board and Ministry of Health Malaysia.

History
{
  "type": "ExternalData",
  "service": "geoshape",
  "ids": "Q16256213",
  "properties": {
    "title": "Lam Wah Ee Nursing College",
    "description": "Campus",
  }
}

Lam Wah Ee Nursing College was started in 1986.

See also
 List of universities in Malaysia

References

External links
 Official Lam Wah Ee Nursing College Website
 Official Lam Wah Ee Hospital Facebook Page

Colleges in Malaysia
Universities and colleges in Penang
Educational institutions established in 1986
1986 establishments in Malaysia
Nursing schools in Malaysia